The Emad o dolah Mosque is related to the Qajar dynasty and is located in Kermanshah. It was built in 1868 by Prince  Emam Qoli Mirza, son of Mohammad Ali Mirza and governor of Kermanshah.

References

Mosques in Iran
Mosque buildings with domes
National works of Iran